The Underline is a 10-mile linear park being developed in Miami-Dade County, Florida.  When complete, it will run underneath the county's elevated Metrorail system from the Miami River near Brickell to the Metrorail's southern terminus at Dadeland South.  The project is essentially upgrading a pre-existing bike path, known as the M-Path, into a full linear park.  As of 2022, the first phase of the Underline is complete in the Brickell area.  The second phase, which will run from Brickell to just south of Vizcaya station, is set to be complete in February 2023.  The full park will be complete in 2025.

Route

The Underline begins at the Miami River in the Brickell neighborhood of Downtown Miami.  At the river, it connects to the Miami River Greenway.  From here, it runs south underneath the Metrorail through Brickell, Coral Gables, and Kendall, where it will end at the Dadeland South station.

At Dadeland South, the Underline is planned to connect with the proposed Ludlam Trail Linear Park. It will also connect with the  South Dade Rail Trail beyond Dadeland South, which runs along the South Dade rapid transit busway (also former Florida East Coast Railway right of way) all the way to Florida City. Both trails are part of the ambitious East Coast Greenway project.

Brickell Backyard
The north end of the line includes the Brickell Backyard.  The Brickell Backyard is an urban park along the Underline that includes basketball courts, an outdoor gym, nature and butterfly gardens, and gathering spaces.

History

The Underline's predecessor, the MetroPath (M-Path), was mostly built along with the Metrorail and opened in 1984.  This segment of the Metrorail was built along the former right of way of the Florida East Coast Railway's main line between Miami and Kendall, which was abandoned in 1972 and purchased by Miami-Dade County in 1979.  The M-Path has been popular among cyclists, some of whom use it to commute to and from downtown, as well as runners.

In late 2011, the MetroPath was extended and a  bridge was added over the freeway style entrance to the Snapper Creek Expressway (S.R. 878) near Dadeland North station to complete the M-Path with the exception of a few small breaks at major road crossings such as near the north end at Coral Way (SW 13 Street) in Brickell and the Douglas Road area around Bird Road in Coral Gables.

In 2014, plans were made to revamp the M-Path as a linear park, taking after the popular High Line in New York City, by a group known as "Friends of the GreenLink. The University of Miami assisted in the procurement of the idea. Into 2015, the proposal gained momentum and rebranded itself as [Friends of] "The Underline". Actual design work was done by James Corner, and the project was recognized by the county.

References

External links

 The Underline

Hiking trails in Florida
Rail trails in Florida
Rails with trails
Bike paths in Florida
Tourist attractions in Miami
Transportation in Miami